Veterinary and Comparative Oncology is a quarterly peer-reviewed scientific journal covering new scientific developments in veterinary oncology and comparative oncology. It was established in 2003 and is published by John Wiley & Sons on behalf of the Veterinary Cancer Society.

According to the Journal Citation Reports, its 2020 impact factor is 2.613, ranking it 29 out of 146 journals in the category 'Veterinary Sciences'.

References

External links 
 

English-language journals
Veterinary medicine journals
Wiley-Blackwell academic journals
Academic journals associated with learned and professional societies